Hephaestus is a genus of freshwater ray-finned fish, grunters from the family Terapontidae.

Species
The following species are classified within the genus:

 Hephaestus adamsoni (Trewavas, 1940) (Adamson's grunter) 
 Hephaestus carbo (Ogilby & McCulloch, 1916) (Coal grunter) 
 Hephaestus epirrhinos Vari & Hutchins, 1978 (Longnose sooty grunter) 
 Hephaestus fuliginosus (Macleay, 1883) (Sooty grunter) 
 Hephaestus habbemai (Weber, 1910) (Mountain grunter) 
 Hephaestus jenkinsi (Whitley, 1945) (Western sooty grunter )
 Hephaestus komaensis Allen & Jebb, 1993
 Hephaestus lineatus Allen, 1984 (Lined grunter) 
 Hephaestus obtusifrons (Mees & Kailola, 1977)
 Hephaestus raymondi (Mees & Kailola, 1977) (Raymond's grunter) 
 Hephaestus roemeri (Weber, 1910) (Röemer's grunter) 
 Hephaestus transmontanus (Mees & Kailola, 1977) (Sepik grunter)
 Hephaestus trimaculatus (Macleay, 1883) (Threespot grunter) 
 Hephaestus tulliensis De Vis, 1884 (Khaki grunter)

References

 
Terapontidae